The , often called the Japan Academy Prize, the Japan Academy Awards, and the Japanese Academy Awards, is a series of awards given annually since 1978 by the Japan Academy Film Prize Association (日本アカデミー賞協会, Nippon Akademii-shou Kyoukai) for excellence in Japanese film. Award categories are similar to the Academy Awards.

Venue 

Since 1998 the venue is regularly the Grand Prince Hotel New Takanawa of Prince Hotels in Takanawa, Minato-ku, Tokyo. Admission tickets for this award ceremony are also sold to regular customers. As of 2015, there is a charge of 40,000 Yen which includes a French cuisine course dinner named after the award ceremony. Spectators are expected to attend in semi-formal attire. Elementary school students and younger are not permitted.

Award 

The winners are selected from the recipients of the Award for Excellence. The award statue of the winner measures 27 cm × 11 cm × 11 cm (10.7 in × 4.4 in × 4.4 in). The recipients of the Award for Excellence receive a smaller statue.

Categories

Award winners

References

External links
  - 
Awards of the Japanese Academy - Overview on IMDb

1978 establishments in Japan
Annual events in Japan
Awards established in 1978
 
Japanese awards
Japanese film awards
Lists of films by award
Recurring events established in 1978